Armshead is a village in Staffordshire, England. Population details for the 2011 census can be found under Cheddleton.

Villages in Staffordshire